Hugo Daniel Fernández Vallejo (2 February 1945 – 1 August 2022) was an Uruguayan football player and manager.

Career 
Fernández played professional football in Uruguay, Argentina, Spain and Mexico. He played for Mexican side Puebla F.C. in 1979, before returning home with CA Peñarol.

After he retired from playing, Fernández became a football coach. He has managed former club, Puebla, on three occasions. He has also managed Consadole Sapporo in Japan.

Managerial statistics

References

External links 
 
 
 ■JJF☆じょっぴん共同通信■ 

1945 births
2022 deaths
Uruguayan footballers
Association football defenders
Uruguayan Primera División players
Argentine Primera División players
Liga MX players
Club Nacional de Football players
Racing Club de Montevideo players
C.A. Cerro players
Defensor Sporting players
Club de Gimnasia y Esgrima La Plata footballers
Peñarol players
CD Tenerife players
Club Puebla players
Atlas F.C. footballers
Uruguayan football managers
J1 League managers
Club Puebla managers
C.D. Veracruz managers
Club Nacional de Football managers
Hokkaido Consadole Sapporo managers
Footballers from Montevideo
Uruguayan expatriate footballers
Uruguayan expatriate football managers
Uruguayan expatriate sportspeople in Argentina
Expatriate footballers in Argentina
Uruguayan expatriate sportspeople in Mexico
Expatriate footballers in Mexico
Expatriate football managers in Mexico
Uruguayan expatriate sportspeople in Spain
Expatriate footballers in Spain
Uruguayan expatriate sportspeople in Japan
Expatriate football managers in Japan